Kilefjorden is a lake on in Agder county, Norway. The lake is located on the border of the municipalities of Evje og Hornnes, Iveland, and Vennesla. The lake is part of the river Otra.

The steamship Bjoren worked in this lake from 1866–1896 transporting people and items across the lake.  In 1896, the boat was moved to the Byglandsfjorden.  The Norwegian National Road 9 runs along the southwestern end of the lake.

Prior to 1950, the lake's outflow was at the waterfall Soga on the southeast end of the lake.  In 1950, the Gåseflå dam was built further upstream creating the lake Gåseflåfjorden which adjoins the Kilefjorden at the same surface elevation so the waterfall is now underwater and it can only be seen when the lake Gåseflå is lowered for work on the power station.

Media gallery

See also
List of lakes in Aust-Agder
List of lakes in Norway

References

Lakes of Agder
Setesdal
Evje og Hornnes
Iveland
Vennesla